Kate Lanier is an American screenwriter best known for such films as CrazySexyCool: The TLC Story, What's Love Got to Do with It, Beauty Shop, Glitter, The Mod Squad and Set It Off.

References

External links

American women screenwriters
Living people
Place of birth missing (living people)
Year of birth missing (living people)
21st-century American women